Lake Whitney is a lake in McLeod County, in the U.S. state of Minnesota.

Lake Whitney bears the name of an early settler.

See also
List of lakes in Minnesota

References

Lakes of Minnesota
Lakes of McLeod County, Minnesota